Alexander "Alex" Abraham Zahavi (born 21 January 1991) is a Israeli former professional footballer who played as a winger or forward.

Zahavi was born in the United States, the son of a Portuguese mother and Israeli father. He has represented Portugal at youth levels but considered switching federations so he can represent the United States. He is the great nephew of football agent Pini Zahavi. Zahavi is a winger who plays on the left side of midfield, even though he is right-footed.

Club career
On 16 July 2010, Zahavi joined Maccabi Haifa on trial trying to impress Elisha Levy. On 26 July he was presented as a Maccabi Haifa player after he signed a contract with the club.

Zahavi joined Israeli Premier League club Hapoel Acre in February 2011 on loan for the remainder of the 2010–11 season.

On 7 July, Maccabi Haifa announced that they extended Zahavi's contract through the 2015 season, and are loaning him to Primeira Liga team Vitória de Setúbal for the 2011–12 season. Zahavi joined Portuguese top-flight side S.C. Olhanense for the 2012–13 season.

International career
Zahavi represented Portugal at various youth levels but was never called into the senior team.  Because he played in an official UEFA U17 qualifying tournament for Portugal, he was cap tied to their national team under FIFA eligibility rules.  However, since he is also eligible to play for Israel or the United States, he was allowed to file for a one-time only switch with FIFA.

Zahavi was called up to the United States U-20's team in November 2010 for the Torneo de las Americas.

On 20 February 2011, Zahavi was called in for his first Israel U-21 camp. Three days later Zahavi played in a friendly with the under-21 side against FC Arsenal Kyiv. In March 2011, Zahavi was brought in for another training camp. On 17 March 2011 Zahavi was named to the under-21 side for a tournament in Austria. Zahavi made his debut for the side in a friendly against Georgia on 23 March 2011. Zahavi scored his first goal for the under-21 side in a friendly against Romania on 26 March 2011 in Austria. Zahavi floated the ball over the Romanian goalkeeper from 35 metres out after exchanging passes with Nes Zamir.

Career statistics

References

External links

1991 births
Living people
Sporting CP footballers
Vitória F.C. players
Primeira Liga players
American soccer players
Israeli footballers
Soccer players from California
Maccabi Haifa F.C. players
Hapoel Acre F.C. players
Portugal youth international footballers
Portuguese footballers
United States men's under-20 international soccer players
Israel under-21 international footballers
American people of Israeli descent
American people of Portuguese descent
Portuguese people of Israeli descent
Israeli people of Portuguese descent
Association football wingers
Association football forwards